Wellington Suburbs may refer to:
 The suburbs of Wellington, New Zealand
 Wellington South and Suburbs, a former New Zealand electorate (1887–1890)
 Wellington Suburbs and Country, a former New Zealand electorate (1911–1919)
 Wellington Suburbs (New Zealand electorate), a former electorate (1893–1902, 1908–1911, 1919–1946)